Bibi Balwant Kaur (Punjabi: ਬਿਬੀ ਬਲਵਨਤ ਕੌਰ, 10 May 1915, in Soos, Punjab – 21 March 2009), also known as Bibi Balwant Kaur Soor or Bibi ji, was the founder and chairperson of Mata Nanki Foundation, located at Rookery Road, Birmingham, the head of the Bebe Nanaki movement and the Mata Nanaki movement.

In 2000, Bibi Balwant Kaur was awarded the MBE (Member of the Most Excellent Order of the British Empire) by Queen Elizabeth for dedicating her life to charitable causes. In 2007, she won the Sikh Women's Alliance Award for her "lifetime work in the service of worldwide humanity."

References

External links
Gurdwara Bebe Nanaki Ji
Matananki Foundation

British Sikhs
1915 births
2009 deaths
Indian emigrants to the United Kingdom
20th-century British philanthropists